William Young Knowlton (August 18, 1898 – February 25, 1944) was a right-handed baseball pitcher.

Early life
Knowlton was born in Philadelphia in 1898. According to one account, he got his start in baseball at the Baldwin Locomotive Works in Eddystone, Pennsylvania. According to another, he gained fame as a sandlot pitcher in Philadelphia and then played for Petersburg in the Virginia League.

Career

Baseball
Kowlton appeared in one game in Major League Baseball. On September 3, 1920, he started a game for the Philadelphia Athletics against the Washington Senators at Shibe Park. He pitched 5-2/3 innings and allowed three earned runs in a losing effort. His career record in Major League Baseball was zero wins, one loss, five strikeouts, and a 4.76 earned run average.

Knowlton continued playing in the minor leagues for several years, including stints with the Jersey City Skeeters (1922), Crisfield Crabbers (1922), Wilkes-Barre Barons (1925-1926), Toronto Maple Leafs (1926), and Williamsport Grays (1926-1929). He also reportedly played for baseball clubs in Montreal and Decatur, Illinois.

Philadelphia Police Department
Knowlton joined the Philadelphia Police Department in 1938, serving in the 42nd District. He was married to Irene Knowlton at that time.

Death
Knowlton died in Philadelphia in 1944 at age 45. He collapsed as he stepped from a trolley car of an apparent heart attack.

References

External links

Major League Baseball pitchers
Philadelphia Athletics players
Baseball players from Pennsylvania
1898 births
1944 deaths
Crisfield Crabbers players
Jersey City Skeeters players
Wilkes-Barre Barons (baseball) players
Toronto Maple Leafs (International League) players
Williamsport Grays players